Neda is a municipality in province of A Coruña in the autonomous community of Galicia in northwestern Spain.

The town is on the English Way path of the Camino de Santiago. It is said that the father of George A. Romero was born here.

Parishes 

The municipality is home to four parishes:
 San Pedro de Anca
 San Nicolás de Neda
 Santa María de Neda
 Santo André de Viladonelle

Economy 

Neda is a predominantly rural borough, though important industries like shipyards, foundries, and workshops are to be found in nearby Ferrol. Farming, agriculture and services, together with bread making, are the main local industries.

References

Municipalities in the Province of A Coruña